Attorney General Blair may refer to:

Charles A. Blair (1854–1912), Attorney General of Michigan
Francis Preston Blair Jr. (1821–1875), Attorney General for the New Mexico Territory 
Frank S. Blair (1839–1899), Attorney General of Virginia
James Blair (Australian judge) (1870–1944), Attorney-General of Queensland

See also
General Blair (disambiguation)